Ganei Tikva is a town in Israel bordering Kiryat Ono to the west, Petah Tikva to the north, Gat Rimon to the east and Savyon to the south.

History 

Ganei Tikva was formed in 1949,  located on the land of the Palestinian village of Al-'Abbasiyya, which became depopulated in the  1948 Arab–Israeli War.

Shikun Yovel, built in 1949, was the first neighborhood. Ganei Tikva achieved local council status in 1953.
 Yismach Moshe, a religious neighborhood, was built in 1962. (During the Shabat, Yismach Moshe is closed to traffic). Givat Savyon was built in 1972, and is considered a high-end apartment building neighborhood. In an attempt to duplicate Givat Savyon's success, Givat Savyon HaHadasha neighborhood was formed on the eastern side, bordering Gat Rimon. The latest addition to Ganei Tikva is the residential neighborhood Ganim.

Ganei Tikva is known for its high standard of living and quality education. It is located in close proximity to Tel Aviv and Gush Dan, and is characterized by a diverse ethnic Jewish mix. The urban pattern includes small detached houses, townhouses and apartment buildings, complemented by mature trees and low traffic levels.

Transportation
Ganei Tikva has three access roads. On the west, the main entry to Ganei Tikva through Kiryat Ono. This is the preferred entry to Tel Aviv. On the east, through Gat Rimon which allows fast entry to Petah Tikva and Highway 6 through Route 471.

Education
There are five elementary schools (including special education), one junior high school ("Harishonim junior high"), and one high school ("Meitar high school") in Ganei Tikva. Ganei Tikva has won the National Education Award for 2007.

References

External links

 Local Council Ganey Tikva 
 Israel Central Bureau of Statistics

Central District (Israel)
Local councils in Central District (Israel)
Populated places established in 1949
1949 establishments in Israel